The Man and the City is an American drama series which aired on ABC as part of its Fall 1971 lineup from September 15, 1971 to January 5, 1972.

Anthony Quinn starred as Thomas Jefferson Alcala, the long-term Hispanic mayor of a major but unidentified city in the Southwestern United States (location shooting was done in Albuquerque, New Mexico).  Arcala's WASP deputy, Andy Hays, was portrayed by Mike Farrell.  Hays' main role was to make sure that the well-meaning Mayor Alcala did not become so engrossed in aiding individual constituents with their problems that he failed to address the issues facing the city as a whole.

Despite the vast talents of Quinn and the earnest Farrell, The Man and the City was a Nielsen ratings failure, finishing third in its Wednesday night time slot against the hit private eye show Mannix and the Rod Serling anthology series Night Gallery, and was cancelled at midseason.

Cast
Anthony Quinn....Thomas Jefferson Alcala
Mike Farrell....Andy Hayes
Mala Powers....Marian Crane
Carmen Zapata...Josefina

Episodes

Awards
Daniel Petrie won a Directors Guild of America Award in 1972 for Outstanding Directorial Achievement in Dramatic Series - Night for the episode "Hands of Love." That same episode earned Petrie an Emmy nomination for Outstanding Directorial Achievement in Drama - A Single Program of a Series with Continuing Characters and/or Theme.

References
Brooks, Tim and Marsh, Earle, The Complete Directory to Prime Time Network and Cable TV Shows

External links

American Broadcasting Company original programming
1970s American drama television series
1971 American television series debuts
1972 American television series endings
Television series by Universal Television
Television shows set in New Mexico
Television shows filmed in New Mexico
American political drama television series